Frederick Timmins de Cordova (October 27, 1910 – September 15, 2001) was an American stage, motion picture and television director and producer. He is best known for his work on The Tonight Show Starring Johnny Carson.

Early life
De Cordova was born in New York City, New York, the son of Margaret (née Timmins) and George de Cordova, who worked in the theatre business. George de Cordova was from a Jamaican Sephardic Jewish family related to Julian de Cordova, founder of the DeCordova Museum and Sculpture Park, and Waco, Texas, founder Jacob de Cordova. In his 1988 autobiography, de Cordova described his parents as con artists who, during his early years, lived well and skipped town without paying their bills. In 1931, he received an undergraduate degree in liberal arts from Northwestern University.

Career
De Cordova's first theater credit was as a performer in Elmer, the Great (1928). After his graduation from Harvard Law School in 1933, he gained employment in the Shubert Theater organization and directed stage shows for the next ten years. He was variously a performer, stage manager, stage director, and finally, dialogue director, the last in Ziegfeld Follies of 1943.

He was a dialogue director in five films, including To Have and Have Not (1944). His first film directing job was Too Young to Know (1945) for Warner Brothers. He directed 23 movies. One of the better known was Bedtime for Bonzo (1951) starring future President Ronald Reagan and a chimpanzee. He also directed Rock Hudson, Errol Flynn, Tony Curtis, Audie Murphy, Yvonne de Carlo, Bob Hope, and Humphrey Bogart. Much of his career was at Universal Studios, where he was known for turning out entertaining pictures quickly, even with difficult actors, and on a low budget. His last film was Frankie and Johnny (1966) with Elvis Presley.

He turned to directing television when there was less need for low-budget movies to serve as the second half of a double feature. His skills were perfect for TV. His TV career began in 1950 with directing The Jack Benny Program, on which he was played several times by actor Ross Elliott. Other programs he directed include The George Burns and Gracie Allen Show, The Bob Cummings Show, The George Gobel Show, December Bride, Leave It to Beaver, My Three Sons (108 episodes), and The Smothers Brothers Show. He directed and/or produced more than 500 TV series or segments. He produced The Tonight Show Starring Johnny Carson starting in 1970 using the name Fred de Cordova.  He became producer of the show in 1970 and executive producer in 1984. In a 1981 interview, he described his job as "chief traffic cop, talent scout, No. 1 fan and critic all rolled into one". De Cordova was described as ".. a large, looming, beaming man with horn-rimmed glasses, an Acapulcan tan, and an engulfing handshake that is a contract in itself, complete with small print and an option for renewal on both sides." He was executive producer when the final Carson Tonight Show signed off on May 22, 1992. He won five Emmys for his work on the show.

During tapings of the Tonight Show, de Cordova would sit in a chair just beyond the guests' couch so that he could cue Carson directly and speak with him during commercial breaks. By the 1980s, Carson would occasionally speak to de Cordova during the show, although usually the moment would pass so quickly that there would be no time to give de Cordova a microphone or catch him on camera.

These awkward exchanges became an object of parody. An episode of SCTV aired in 1981 featured a sketch of "The Freddie de Cordova Show". The segment was almost an exact copy of the Tonight Show, except the host's desk was empty; de Cordova conducted all of his interviews from his usual perch off-camera. On the real program in 1988, as a takeoff on the installation of lights in Wrigley Field, Carson ceremonially installed a light on the edge of the set so that de Cordova could finally be seen.

In June 1991, Carson's son Ricky was killed in an automobile accident; a month later, Carson paid tribute at the end of a show to his son. De Cordova was concerned that the show was going long and gave Carson the "wrap it up sign." Carson was so infuriated, from that point forward de Cordova was no longer permitted to be in the studio during the taping of the show, although he remained the show's executive producer.

During guest appearances on Late Night with Conan O'Brien, comedian Will Ferrell played the role of a deluded Robert Goulet, who believed himself to be a guest on The Tonight Show Starring Johnny Carson. Ferrell's fictional Goulet made references to de Cordova, insisting that de Cordova owed him money (or, conversely, that Goulet owed de Cordova money).

In 1995 and 1998, respectively, de Cordova appeared as himself on The Larry Sanders Show in the fourth-season episode, "Eight", and in the sixth-season episode, "As My Career Lay Dying". The character of 'Artie' is largely based on de Cordova. 

Martin Scorsese's 1982 film, The King of Comedy, about a delusional fan (Robert De Niro) who kidnaps a late-night talk-show host (Jerry Lewis), cast de Cordova as the show's producer.

Personal life and death
De Cordova married former actress Janet Thomas in 1963, and they remained married for the rest of his life. He died of natural causes at the Motion Picture and Television Fund Hospital in Woodland Hills, California on September 15, 2001 and is buried at Holy Cross Cemetery in Culver City, California.

Acting filmography

References

Further reading
Bernstein, F., "Traffic cop, talent scout, critic. Fred De Cordova keeps Carson's Tonight Show on track" People Weekly, 22:131-2. October 8, 1984
de Cordova, Fred, "Johnny Came Lately: An Autobiography". New York: Simon and Schuster, 1988.  (hardcover); paperback reprint edition, Pocket Books, 1989, .
Bennett, Mark, "The Big Show: A tribute to my mentor and friend, Fred de Cordova". Hawaii: The Larry Czerwonka Company, 2013. , 978-0615856407.

External links

Tonight Show bio

1910 births
2001 deaths
Harvard Law School alumni
American Sephardic Jews
Television producers from New York City
Businesspeople from New York City
Burials at Holy Cross Cemetery, Culver City
Northwestern University alumni
20th-century American businesspeople